L'union Suite is a Haitian-American lifestyle, tourism, culture, society, and entertainment media company based in South Florida. L'union Suite has quickly become the number one platform for Haitian-Americans with over 450,000 subscriptions and a reach of around 5–10 million weekly.

History 
Started as a small blog, L'union Suite was created by Whenda "Wanda" Tima-Gilles in order to provide a platform to connect with other Haitian-Americans who felt disconnected from Haitian culture as she did. Wanda who was born in Cap-Haïtien, grew up in the Turks and Caicos and emigrated to South Florida as a teen, knew of the customs but not what they meant and was late in learning about Haitian history and culture. In an attempt to learn more about Haiti online, her findings were underwhelming as there was an over-emphasis concerning the country's impoverishment rather than the rich culture she knew it had and aimed to change that. Instead, Wanda dedicated herself in highlighting positive and uplifting stories about Haiti and its diaspora from the experiences to the achievements which began as a personal project.

Founder 
Wanda has been featured in Forbes, BET, Black Enterprise and was honored as a receipt for Miami's 40 Under 40 Black Leaders for Today and Tomorrow in 2016 by Legacy magazine. She graduated from Dillard High School at age 16 and became the first person in her family to graduate from college when she obtained a bachelor's degree in mass communication with a concentration in journalism and public relations from Bethune–Cookman University. Wanda had previously worked in audiovisual media for various radio stations, interned for BET Network and two other TV stations in Daytona and Orlando, Florida. She currently resides in South Florida.

Charitable works
Each year L’union Suite adopts a new project to fundraise by hosting annual events, most notably the ”Strike for Education” bowling tournament where celebrities, influencers and South Florida residents have turned out for.

On 30 April 2018, L’union Suite opened a computer lab, which also included school supplies and new blackboards in Collège Bell Angelot in Cap-Haïtien, Haiti for students between 7th and 12th grades in order for them to take full advantage of S.T.E.M., which is a term aimed to further academic disciplines in science, technology, engineering, and mathematics through focused lab. Contributions were raised from an annual fundraiser hosted by L’union Suite which included support from the likes of Pierre Garçon and Spirit Airlines to name a few.

References

External links
 Official Website

2011 establishments in the United States
American blogs
Black-owned companies of the United States
Haitian-American history
Haitian-American culture in Florida
Caribbean American
Internet properties established in 2011
Video blogs